Our God Saves is Paul Baloche's seventh studio album, released in 2007.

Track listing

Personnel 
 Paul Baloche – lead vocals, acoustic guitars
 Chris Springer – acoustic piano, keyboards
 Ari Heinekanen – Fender Rhodes, Hammond B3 organ
 Austin Deptula – programming, loops, strings
 Ben Gowell – electric guitars, mandolin
 Don Harris – bass
 Carl Albrecht – drums, percussion
 Rita Baloche – backing vocals, lead vocals (8)
 David Baloche – backing vocals (1, 8, 3, 14)
 Perry Coleman – backing vocals (2-7, 9-12)
 Kathryn Scott – lead vocals (4)
 Pastor Martin Sempa – prayer (5)
 Brenton Brown – lead vocals (6)
 Matt Redman – lead vocals (7)
 Lincoln Brewster – lead vocals (10)
 Glenn Packiam – lead vocals (11)

Production 
 Don Moen – executive producer 
 Chris Springer – A&R 
 Paul Baloche – producer 
 Austin Deptula – producer, recording, mixing 
 Greg Hunt – recording
 Gary Leach – recording
 Brenton Brown – additional recording 
 Lincoln Brewster – additional recording 
 Matthew Fallentine – additional recording 
 Trevor Michael – additional recording 
 Roy Rainey – additional recording 
 Doug Sax – mastering 
 Sangwook Nam – mastering
 Frank Dejong – production coordinator 
 Markus Frehner – art direction, design 
 Jimmy Abegg – photography

Studios
 Recorded and Mixed at Rosewood Studios (Tyler, Texas).
 Mastered at The Mastering Lab (Hollywood, California).

References

2007 albums
Paul Baloche albums